New England Dragway is a  mile NHRA dragway in Epping, New Hampshire, Rockingham County, United States. The track hosts the New England Nationals event as part of the NHRA Camping World Drag Racing Series. The track also hosts a regional event as part of the NHRA Lucas Oil Drag Racing Series.

History 

New England Dragway opened for racing on September 11, 1966. Organized drag racing in the New England area had begun in 1950 at various public and military airports in the region. In that same year, a small number of Boston-area enthusiasts formed the New England Timing Association (NETA) to promote the sport. NETA based its organization and rules on those used by the Southern California Timing Association (SCTA), and began hosting drag races on an irregular basis at airports in Newington, NH, Beverly, MA and finally at Sanford, ME. Three years later, five regional hot rod clubs joined forces to form the New England Hot Rod Council (NEHRC). 

The NEHRC held its first official drag racing events in 1953 at the Newington Airport (also known as Pease Air Force Base). in 1955 they began hosting regularly scheduled events at Sanford which began to attract racers from all over New England. Sanford proved to be a popular drag racing venue that drew large spectator crowds and attracted the attention of numerous nationally known racers such as Don Garlits and Art Arfons. 

By the mid-1960s, it became clear that airports were not completely satisfactory for conducting organized drag races. Conflicts with pilots, limited control over the condition of the racing surface, and the lack of permanent facilities made it difficult for volunteer organizations to set and maintain a regular schedule for events. Numerous races had to be canceled at the last minute due to this lack of control over the venues.

The NEHRC began looking for a suitable location to purchase land for the construction of a drag strip that would service the Boston market. After an exhaustive search, a large tract of land on the border of the rural towns of Epping, NH and Brentwood, NH was purchased by a group of shareholders, and construction of the racing surface and permanent facilities was completed in the late summer of 1966. 

The track was originally sanctioned by the American Hot Rod Association (AHRA), and was also qualified by the National Hot Rod Association (NHRA) as an officially recognized track for speed and elapsed time records. New England Dragway played host to an annual stop on the AHRA Grand American Series of Professional Drag Racing Series until that organization's demise in the mid-1980s. The NHRA then become the sanctioning body for the track but did not include it in their national event schedule. 

In an effort to get a national event at the track, New England Dragway switched its sanctioning to the International Hot Rod Association (IHRA) in 1992. The IHRA held its North American Nationals at the track from 1992 until 2009. 

In 2010, sanctioning returned to the NHRA, and in 2013, following improvements and upgrades to the facility, the drag strip began hosting the NHRA New England Nationals.

Events 

New England Dragway hosts weekly bracket racing events for locally and regionally-based non-professional drag racers on the weekends, and races for street-legal vehicles two times during the week. The track also hosts annual drag racing special events for import cars and nostalgia drag racers. For many years the track has also held major events featuring match racing between nitromethane and alcohol-powered funny cars, (Funny Cars Under The Stars), and jet-powered dragsters and funny cars (Jet Cars Under The Stars)

Notable Drag Racers 

As the premier drag racing facility in New England, New England Dragway has played host to numerous well-known drag racers since its opening. In the late 1960s and 1970s, "Jungle Jim" Liberman was a frequent competitor at the track. "TV" Tommy Ivo and Bruce Larson also made regular appearances. On July 11, 1998, World Champion dragster driver Shirley Muldowney was the first racer to top the 300-mph mark at the track when she ran 302.82 mph in match race competition.

NHRA Camping World Drag Racing Series 

The 2020 New England Nationals were canceled due to the COVID-19 pandemic.

New England Dragway will host the New England Nationals as part of NHRA Camping World Drag Racing Series on the weekend of June 11-13, 2021.

National Event Winners

New England Hot Rod Hall of Fame 

The New England Hot Rod Hall of Fame is a memorial located at the entrance to the racing pits of New England Dragway listing more than 100 people, teams, and businesses that have had a significant impact on the hobby of hot rodding and the sport of drag racing in New England. 

The New England Hot Rod Hall of Fame was created in 2005 by the Orientals Hot Rod Club of Reading, MA. Each year since the club has inducted at least four new honorees. The list of inductees includes hot rodders, drag racers, drag racing teams, photographers and journalists, promoters, businesses and business owners, and individuals involved in hot rodding and drag racing as support personnel at various drag racing facilities in the New England region.

As of 2021, there are 106 inductees. Sixty-two of them are individual hot rodders and/or drag racers, along with 14 drag racing teams, 16 businesses and business owners, six journalists and photographers, four employees of drag racing facilities, and four clubs or organizations. Many of the inductees can be categorized as belonging to more than one of those groups. 

Notable inductees include Frank Maratta, founder of the Hartford Autorama Car Shows and builder and promoter of Connecticut Dragway; Chuck Etchells and Al Hofmann, professional funny car drivers from Connecticut; Arnie "Woo Woo" Ginsburg, a radio personality who provided the musical soundtrack for the hot rod cruising culture in the 1950s and 60s; Moroso Performance, provider of aftermarket performance parts, and Marvin Rifchin, founder of the M&H Tire Company that provides specialty tires for drag racing.

See also
 Lee USA Speedway, located in nearby Lee
 Star Speedway, also located in Epping

References

External links
New England Dragway website
IHRA North American Nationals results
Roaring engines a welcome sign at New England Dragway
New England Dragway in New Hampshire has ambitious plans for 2021
New England Hot Rod Of Fame Inductees

NHRA Division 1 drag racing venues
Drag racing venues
Motorsport venues in New Hampshire
Epping, New Hampshire
Buildings and structures in Rockingham County, New Hampshire
Tourist attractions in Rockingham County, New Hampshire